The Uyghur Arabic alphabet is a version of the Arabic alphabet used for writing the Uyghur language, primarily by Uyghurs living in China. It is one of several Uyghur alphabets and has been the official alphabet of the Uyghur language since 1982.

The first Perso-Arabic derived alphabet for Uyghur was developed in the 10th century, when Islam was introduced there. The version used for writing the Chagatai language. It became the regional literary language, now known as the Chagatay alphabet. It was used nearly exclusively up to the early 1920s. Alternative Uyghur scripts then began emerging and collectively largely displaced Chagatai; Kona Yëziq, meaning 'old script', now distinguishes it and UEY from the alternatives that are not derived from Arabic. Between 1937 and 1954, the Perso-Arabic alphabet used to write Uyghur was modified by removing redundant letters and adding markings for vowels. A Cyrillic alphabet was adopted in the 1950s and a Latin alphabet in 1958. The modern Uyghur Perso-Arabic alphabet was made official in 1978 and reinstituted by the Chinese government in 1983, with modifications for representing Uyghur vowels.

The Arabic alphabet used before the modifications (Kona Yëziq) did not represent Uyghur vowels and according to Robert Barkley Shaw, spelling was irregular and long vowel letters were frequently written for short vowels since most Turki speakers were unsure of the difference between long and short vowels. The pre-modification alphabet used Arabic diacritics (and ) to mark short vowels.

The reformed modern Uyghur Arabic alphabet eliminated letters whose sounds were found only in Arabic and spelled Arabic and Persian loanwords such as Islamic religious words, as they were pronounced in Uyghur and not as they were originally spelled in Arabic or Persian.

Current Official Alphabet 
The table below lists all 32 letters of the current official Uyghur alphabet used in Xinjiang in alphabetical order, along with their IPA transcriptions. 

Note:  also represents /ʔ/ but it is usually ignored at the beginning of words. It still reads /ʔ/ in the middle, such as  /saʔɛt/ hour.

Spelling of Suffixes 
Uyghur spelling borrowed heavily from Chagatai influences. The spelling of the suffixes from Uyghur also matched Chagatai spellings which were kept largely static. Below is an incomplete list of suffixed spellings and their vowel harmony alternatives. Frequently, some Chagatai suffixes were separated from their root words by a zero width non-joiner while in modern Uyghur the root+suffix would be joined.  

Several of these alternatives were influenced by security-policy considerations of the Soviet Union or the People's Republic of China. (Soviet Uyghur areas experienced several non-Arabic alphabets and the former CIS countries, especially Kazakhstan, now use primarily a Cyrillic-based alphabet, called Uyghur Siril Yëziqi.)

A Pinyin-derived Latin-based alphabet (with additional letters borrowed from Cyrillic), then called "New script" or Uyghur Yëngi Yëziq or UYY, was for a time the only officially approved alphabet used for Uyghur in Xinjiang. It had technical shortcomings and met social resistance; Uyghur Ereb Yëziqi (UEY), an expansion of the old Chagatai alphabet based on the Arabic script, is now recognized, along with a newer Latin-based alphabet called Uyghur Latin Yëziqi or ULY, replacing the former Pinyin-derived alphabet; UEY is sometimes intended when the term "Kona Yëziq" is used.

Historical Spellings

Old and Modern Alphabet Spelling Comparisons

References

Arabic alphabets
Uyghur language
Alphabets used by Turkic languages